Letterpress is an iOS game developed by American studio atebits and released on October 24, 2012. It was released on 20 July 2016 to the Mac App Store.

Reception
The game has a Metacritic rating of 89 based on 8 critics.

References

Android (operating system) games
IOS games
2012 video games
Video games developed in the United States
Word puzzle video games